Seven Wells Hill is a prominent hill in the Cotswolds hill range in the counties of Gloucestershire and Worcestershire. At , is the second highest point in Gloucestershire.

Location 
Seven Wells Hill is the highest point on a north-south ridge and rises about 3 kilometres south-southeast of the village of Broadway and about 2 kilometres east-northeast of the hamlet of Snowshill. The summit is flanked by woods to the north and west, but is open to the east and south. There are good views from the more open northern part of the ridge, which is called Broadway Hill. To the west the ground slopes steeply downhill through wooded hillsides, while to the east it descends much more gently across open arable country.

The county boundary between Gloucestershire and Worcestershire roughly follows the ridgeline, passing just to the west of the summit by around 100 metres.

The actual summit is at the base of a wall on the south side.

Broadway Tower 
There is a prominent folly called Broadway Tower on the ridgeline about 1200 metres north of the summit of Seven Wells Hill.

See also
List of hills of Gloucestershire

References

External links
 Seven Wells Hill at  www.themountainguide.co.uk
 Seven Wells Hill at mountainviews.ie.
 Seven Wells Hill from road A44 - Hiking route to Seven Wells Hill

Hills of Gloucestershire
Cotswolds